Kosmarevskaya Kuliga is a rural locality (a village) in Gorodishchenskoye Rural Settlement, Nyuksensky District, Vologda Oblast, Russia. The population was 39 as of 2002.

Geography 
Kosmarevskaya Kuliga is located 43 km southeast of Nyuksenitsa (the district's administrative centre) by road. Matveyevskaya is the nearest rural locality.

References 

Rural localities in Nyuksensky District